Jacob Panken (January 13, 1879 – February 4, 1968) was an American socialist politician, best remembered for his tenure as a New York municipal judge and frequent candidacies for high elected office on the ticket of the Socialist Party of America.

Early years

Jacob Panken was born January 13, 1879, in Kiev, Ukraine, then part of the Russian Empire. He was the son of ethnic Jewish parents, Herman Panken and Feiga Berman Panken. His father was employed as a merchant. The family emigrated to the United States in 1890, arriving at New York City, a city in which the family settled.

Panken went to work at age 12, working first making purses and pocketbooks. He later worked as a farmhand, a bookkeeper, and an accountant.

Panken married the former Rachel Pallay on February 20, 1910. His wife would eventually be a Socialist Party politician in her own right, running for the New York City Board of Aldermen in 1919 and for New York State Assembly in 1928 and 1934.

Career
In 1901, Panken left accountancy to go to work as an organizer for the International Ladies' Garment Workers' Union. Returning to the industry in which he first worked as a child, Panken was an organizer of the Purse and Bag Workers' Union in 1903.

Panken graduated from New York University Law School in 1905 and became a practicing attorney in the city.

An outspoken opponent of World War I, Panken was a member of the People's Council for Democracy and Peace in 1917.

Panken attended the 1912 National Convention of the Socialist Party of America (SPA), to which he delivered the report of the "Jewish Socialist Agitation Bureau," forerunner of the Jewish Socialist Federation.

Panken was a public advocate of civil rights for black Americans, sitting on the advisory board of an organization established in 1919 by Chandler Owen and A. Philip Randolph, the National Association for the Promotion of Labor Unionism Among Negroes, the motto of which was "black and white workers unite."

Panken was a leading figure in the bitter 1919 Emergency National Convention of the SPA, chairing the all-important Credentials Committee which acted as a filter to insure the victory of the "Regular" faction headed by Executive Secretary Adolph Germer, New York state party leader Julius Gerber, and National Executive Committee member James Oneal. He was also a delegate to subsequent SPA conventions held in 1920, 1924, and 1932.

Panken was frequent candidate for public office on the ticket of the Socialist Party. He was first a candidate for New York State Senate in the 11th District in 1908. He ran for State Assembly from New York County's 8th District the following year. In 1910 he ran for Justice of the New York Supreme Court for the first time, later pursuing the office again in 1929 and 1931.

Panken won election to a ten-year term as a municipal judge in New York in 1917, the first Socialist to be elected to New York City's Municipal Court.

During his time on the bench, Panken remained a candidate for high offices on behalf of the Socialist Party, pursuing a seat as U.S. Senator from New York in 1920 and running for Mayor of New York in 1921. Panken also ran for U.S. Congress in 1922 and for Governor of New York in 1926.

Running for re-election in 1927, Panken declined to accept endorsement from both the Republican and Communist parties and was defeated in his re-election bid. The 1927 election was the first in the New York City boroughs of Manhattan and Brooklyn to use voting machines in all districts. The result of the election was challenged, with allegations of vote rigging, including an allegation that the lever for Panken's name was rendered inoperable in one district.

The Socialist weekly The New Leader was livid, running a banner headline that "Tammany Thugs" had stolen the election for Democratic candidate Abraham Harawitz:

"The polling places of the 4th assembly district...were scenes of the most disgraceful election stealing.
"In all cases the Tammany election officials were flanked by a collection of gangsters who aided in the intimidation of voters who were being deprived of their votes. The Socialist [poll] watchers who made protests over the procedure were brutalized. The voters were threatened, brow-beaten, and flustered. Notorious gangsters, gunmen, and pimps were on hand in full force taking orders from the Tammany leaders....
"In one polling place a watcher had a gun poked into his ribs and a second later a thug struck him from behind, laying him out; in another polling place a gangster threw tear powder into the eyes of the two Socialist watchers just as the voting machine was being opened for recording of the votes; Socialist watchers were refused the right to note the results tabulated on the machines. Many were ejected and threatened."

Following his defeat, Panken ran again as a Socialist candidate for Congress in 1930 and for Chief Judge in 1932.

During the bitter internal party fight that swept the Socialist Party during the second half of the 1930s, Panken was a committed adherent of the so-called "Old Guard faction" headed by Louis Waldman and James Oneal. In 1936 he exited the SPA along with his co-thinkers to help found the Social Democratic Federation.

Panken was one of the most outspoken anti-Zionists on the Jewish left, a key supporter of the Jewish Newsletter, published by William Zukerman, as well as of the American Council for Judaism.

In 1934, he was appointed to the Domestic Relations Court by Mayor Fiorello La Guardia and served until his retirement in 1955.

Death
Panken died in The Bronx, New York City on February 4, 1968, at the age of 89.

Legacy
His papers are housed at the Wisconsin Historical Society on the campus of the University of Wisconsin–Madison.

Footnotes

Works
 European Jewry in 1925. New York: American Ort, 1925.
 Socialism for America. New York: Rand School Press, n.d. [c. 1933].
 A Judge Sees Germany in Its Color. New York: Jewish Labor Committee, n.d.  [early 1940s].
 The Child Speaks: The Prevention of Juvenile Delinquency. New York: Henry Holt, 1941.

Further reading
 Yaacov N Goldstein, Jewish Socialists in the United States: The Cahan Debate, 1925-1926. Sussex: Sussex Academic Press, 1998.
 Britt P. Tevis, "'The People's Judge': Jacob Panken, Yiddish Socialism, and American Law," American Journal of Legal History 59, no. 1 (March 2019), 31-70. https://doi.org/10.1093/ajlh/njy026

External links
 Jacob Panken, "The Majority Report Should Be Carried Overwhelmingly," letter to The New York Call, May 18, 1917, pg. 6. Retrieved October 27, 2009.
 "Candidate: Jacob Panken," Our Campaigns. Retrieved October 27, 2009.
The People's Court: Jacob Panken, Socialism, and American Law by Britt P. Tevis
 https://books.google.com/books/about/The_People_s_Court.html?id=bar1ZwEACAAJ

Emigrants from the Russian Empire to the United States
American people of Russian-Jewish descent
Jewish anti-Zionism in the United States
Jewish socialists
Politicians from New York City
New York (state) lawyers
1879 births
1968 deaths
Socialist Party of America politicians from New York (state)
Members of the Social Democratic Federation (United States)